Barbra Amesbury (born 1948) is a Canadian philanthropist, singer-songwriter, composer and filmmaker, who had several Top 40 hits in Canada in the 1970s. Amesbury was the long-time partner of Canadian philanthropist Joan Chalmers until her death in 2016.

Known as Bill Amesbury during her active musical career, Amesbury came out as transgender after leaving the music business.

Music

Amesbury's biggest hit was "Virginia (Touch Me Like You Do)", which was also the first single (1974) to be released on the Casablanca Records label, reaching #14 in Canada. Written by Amesbury, the song also reached No. 59 on the U.S. Billboard Hot 100 chart. "Rock My Roll" reached #94 in Canada later in 1974.

"Can You Feel It" was also a minor hit in 1976. Amesbury's "Nothin' But a Fool" has been covered by Natalie Cole, and "A Thrill's a Thrill" was recorded in 1979 by Long John Baldry and covered by Mitch Ryder with Marianne Faithfull and John Cougar.

In 1976 and 1977, Amesbury produced "No Charge" by J.J. Barrie, which became a number one hit in England.  In 1999, "Virginia" was given an award by SOCAN to mark 100,000 spins on Canadian radio stations. 

In 2002, James Collins and Dave Pickell released the single "Do You Mind If We Talk About Bill?", which was written about Amesbury.

Filmmaking and art
In 1994, Amesbury and her partner Joan Chalmers organized an art exhibition called Survivors, In Search of a Voice: The Art of Courage, using the stories of breast cancer survivors to inspire 24 women artists to create works of art aimed at raising awareness of breast cancer. The exhibition toured throughout North America from 1995 to 1998, accompanied by a companion book. Amesbury also shot a documentary film of the tour.

In 2006 and 2007, her documentary film The G8 is Coming...The G8 is Coming was an official selection of the Rome International Film Festival, the Ashville Film Festival, the Atlanta Film Festival, the Southern Winds Film Festival, and the Dixie Film Festival. 

Amesbury and Chalmers have provided support and donations to a variety of charities and organizations through their Woodlawn Arts Foundation.

Discography
 Jus' a Taste of the Kid (1974 – album)
 Can You Feel It (1976 – album)
 "You Belong to Me", b/w "Harlow" (1977 – single, unavailable on any commercially released album)
 "Virginia (Touch Me Like You Do" (1974 – single)
 "Can You Feel It" (1976 – single)
 "Nothin' But a Fool" – composer
 "No Charge" – producer
 "A Thrill's a Thrill" – composer

References

External Links 
 Article at canadianbands.com
  as Bill
  as Barbra/Barbara

1948 births
Canadian documentary film directors
20th-century Canadian philanthropists
Canadian singer-songwriters
Canadian women film directors
Canadian women philanthropists
Capitol Records artists
Casablanca Records artists
Yorkville (record label) artists
Canadian LGBT singers
Canadian LGBT songwriters
Transgender singers
Transgender songwriters
Living people
People from Kirkland Lake
Transgender women musicians
21st-century Canadian LGBT people
Canadian women documentary filmmakers
21st-century Canadian philanthropists